is a former Japanese football player.

Club statistics

References
j-league

External links

1986 births
Living people
Tokoha University alumni
Association football people from Ibaraki Prefecture
Japanese footballers
J2 League players
Japan Football League players
Kataller Toyama players
SP Kyoto FC players
Association football forwards